Die Tapferen Haende im Chaos der Zeit ( Valiant Hands in the Chaos of Time ) is a 2013 short film (Docufiction) written and directed by Mika'ela Fisher.

Plot
Valiant Hands in the Chaos of the Time is a journey from the subconscious to the real perception... Busy hands and creations are the
core of the story, faced with social circumstances and events. 
The Hero is the little tailor strolling somewhat naively through the world, but ultimately proved to be a winner.

Background
Valiant Hands in the Chaos of Time is an autobiography; a poetic tale depicting current events through a merger with reality.

"There was once a little tailor ......."

Reception 
 short film corner Festival de Cannes 2013.
 Revelation Perth International Film Festival 2013  
 Maverick Movie Awards 2013  
 Lucerne International Film Festival   2014 
 Columbus International Film & Video Festival 2014    
  Accolade Global Film Competition 2015

Accolades

Production
The film premiered at the Revelation Perth International Film Festival on July 13, 2013 and started a theatrical run on January 7, 2015 at Cinema Saint André des Arts in Paris.

External links 
 
 Filmstarts Die Tapferen Haende im Chaos der Zeit
 Unifrance Valiant Hands in the Chaos of Time
 Allocine Les Mains Courageuses dans le Chaos du Temps
 Homepage Die Tapferen Haende im Chaos der Zeit

References

2013 films
French short films
Films directed by Mika'ela Fisher
2010s French films